Aritius Sybrandus (Syb) Talma  (17 February 1864, in Angeren – 12 July 1916, in Bennebroek) was a Dutch politician.

References
A.S. Talma at www.parlement.com (Dutch)

1864 births
1916 deaths
People from Lingewaard
Anti-Revolutionary Party politicians
Dutch members of the Dutch Reformed Church
Ministers of Transport and Water Management of the Netherlands
Utrecht University alumni